WRKQ (1250 AM) is an American radio station broadcasting a news/talk format. Licensed to Madisonville, Tennessee, United States, the station is currently owned by Storm Front Communications, LLC. WRKQ is a CBS Radio News affiliate.

References

External links

News and talk radio stations in the United States
RKQ
Monroe County, Tennessee